Heiki Kranich (born 9 October 1961 in Haapsalu) is an Estonian politician. He has been a member of the VII, VIII and XIV Riigikogu. In 1994 he was Minister of Finance. 1999-2003 he was Minister of the Environment.

In 1991 he graduated from Bonch-Bruevich Saint Petersburg State University of Telecommunications in telecommunications engineering speciality.

1983-1991 he was the head of Haapsalu Division.

Since 1990 he has been a member of Estonian Reform Party.

References

Living people
1961 births
Estonian Reform Party politicians
Finance ministers of Estonia
Environment ministers of Estonia
Members of the Riigikogu, 1995–1999
Members of the Riigikogu, 2019–2023
People from Haapsalu
Members of the Riigikogu, 1992–1995